2009 Champions Trophy can refer to:
 The 2009 ICC Champions Trophy
 Hockey
 2009 Men's Hockey Champions Trophy
 2009 Women's Hockey Champions Trophy